Garcia Plays Dylan is an album composed of various live performances featuring Jerry Garcia playing covers of Bob Dylan songs.  It is culled from performances from 1973–1995, and features Garcia playing with Grateful Dead, Legion of Mary, Jerry Garcia Band, and Garcia-Saunders.  Garcia takes lead vocals on all tracks.

Another collection, Postcards of the Hanging, features more Dylan covers performed by the Grateful Dead (with lead vocals shared among Garcia, Bob Weir and Phil Lesh).

Track listing
All songs composed by Bob Dylan, except "Tears of Rage" by Richard Manuel and Bob Dylan.

Disc one
"It Takes a Lot to Laugh, It Takes a Train to Cry" – 8:12
"Tough Mama" – 9:17
"Positively 4th Street" – 10:46
"The Wicked Messenger" – 13:20
"Knockin' on Heaven's Door" – 17:15
"Simple Twist Of Fate" – 10:58
"I Shall Be Released" – 7:40

Disc two
"When I Paint My Masterpiece" – 14:00
"She Belongs to Me" – 6:31
"Forever Young" – 9:05
"Tangled Up In Blue" – 11:48
"Senor (Tales of Yankee Power)" – 7:16
"Visions of Johanna" – 9:21
"Quinn the Eskimo (The Mighty Quinn)" – 5:15
"It's All Over Now, Baby Blue" – 7:07
"Tangled Up In Blue" later released with entire concert on Garcia Live Volume 19
"It's All Over Now, Baby Blue" later released with entire concert on Spring 1990

Bonus Disc – Garcia Plays Dylan Again
"It Takes a Lot to Laugh, It Takes a Train to Cry" (acoustic) – 5:38
"Tears of Rage" – 8:19
"Going, Going, Gone" – 18:56

Track information
Disc one

Jerry Garcia & Merl Saunders.  Recorded Live at The Boarding House, San Francisco, CA (1/25/73)
Jerry Garcia Band. Recorded Live at Keystone, Berkeley, CA (11/18/75)
Jerry Garcia Band. Recorded Live at Keystone, Berkeley, CA (11/17/75)
Legion Of Mary.  Recorded Live at Oriental Theatre, Milwaukee, WI (4/19/75)
Jerry Garcia Band.  Recorded Live at Keystone, Berkeley, CA (2/15/76)
Jerry Garcia Band.  Recorded Live at Santa Cruz Civic Auditorium, Santa Cruz, CA (2/19/78)
Jerry Garcia Band.  Recorded Live at the Warfield Theatre, San Francisco, CA (11/28/87)

Disc two

Jerry Garcia Band.  Recorded Live at The Stone, San Francisco, CA (2/2/80)
Grateful Dead. Recorded Live at Frost Amphitheater, Palo Alto, CA (4/28/85)
Jerry Garcia Band.  Recorded Live at the Warfield Theatre, San Francisco, CA (3/4/88)
Jerry Garcia Band.  Recorded Live at Oakland Coliseum, Oakland, CA (10/31/92)
Jerry Garcia Band.  Recorded Live at the Warfield Theatre, San Francisco, CA (4/23/93)
Grateful Dead.  Recorded Live at Soldier Field, Chicago, IL (7/8/95)
Grateful Dead.  Recorded Live at Sullivan Stadium, Foxboro, MA (7/2/89)
Grateful Dead.  Recorded Live at Copps Coliseum, Hamilton, Ontario (3/22/90)

Bonus Disc - "Garcia Plays Dylan Again"

Garcia/Kahn. Neighbors of Woodcraft, Portland, OR - late show (06/04/82)
Jerry Garcia Band. Greek Theater, Berkeley, CA - (08/05/90)
Legion Of Mary. Keystone, Berkeley, CA - (05/22/75)

Credits
Jerry Garcia - guitar, vocals

Jerry Garcia & Merl Saunders
Merl Saunders - organ
John Kahn - electric bass
Bill Vitt - drums

Jerry Garcia Band
Nicky Hopkins - piano on disc 1, tracks 2-3
John Kahn - bass
Ron Tutt - drums on disc 1, tracks 2-3 & 5
Keith Godchaux - piano on disc 1, tracks 5-6
Donna Godchaux - vocals on disc 1, track 5
Buzz Buchanan - drums on disc 1, track 6
Gloria Jones - vocals on disc 1, track 7, disc 2, tracks 3-5
David Kemper - drums on disc 1, track 7, disc 2, tracks 3-5
Jackie LaBranch - vocals on disc 1, track 7, disc 2, tracks 3-5
Ozzie Ahlers - keyboards on disc 2, track 1
Johnny de Fonseca - drums on disc 2, track 1

Legion of Mary
Merl Saunders - organ
John Kahn - bass
Ron Tutt - drums
Martin Fierro - saxophone

Grateful Dead
Bob Weir - guitar, vocals
Phil Lesh - bass, vocals
Brent Mydland - keyboards, vocals on disc 2, tracks 2 & 7-8
Mickey Hart - drums
Bill Kreutzmann - drums
Vince Welnick - keyboards on disc 2, track 6

See also
List of songs written by Bob Dylan
List of artists who have covered Bob Dylan songs

References

Bob Dylan tribute albums
Grateful Dead compilation albums
Jerry Garcia live albums
2005 live albums
2005 compilation albums
Rhino Records compilation albums
Rhino Records live albums
Grateful Dead live albums
Jerry Garcia compilation albums